Rubén Gajardo (born 5 January 1968) is a Chilean former professional tennis player.

Gajardo, a South American Games silver medalist for Chile, began competing on the professional tour in the late 1980s. He had a career high singles ranking of 348, with his best Challenger performance a semi-final appearance at Ostend in 1988. At Grand Prix level he made a second round once, when he beat Andrei Olhovskiy at Kitzbühel in 1989.

References

External links
 
 

1968 births
Living people
Chilean male tennis players
South American Games silver medalists for Chile
South American Games medalists in tennis
Competitors at the 1986 South American Games